Samuel Walker (born June 7, 1999) is an American professional ice hockey forward for the Minnesota Wild of the National Hockey League (NHL).He was drafted in the seventh round of the 2017 NHL Entry Draft by the Tampa Bay Lightning with the 200th overall selection.

Playing career

Amateur 
Walker played for Edina High School for four seasons where he finished with 167 points. Walker was the team captain his senior year. After the 2017–18 season, he won the Minnesota Mr. Hockey Award.

He began his collegiate hockey career for the University of Minnesota during the 2018–19 season and in playing his full collegiate tenure with the Golden Gophers he became the first three-year captain in school history.

Professional
At the conclusion of his collegiate career, Walker opted to become a free agent after declining to sign with draft club, the Tampa Bay Lightning. On August 18, 2022, he opted to sign with home state team, the Minnesota Wild, in agreeing to a two-year, entry-level contract. After attending his first Wild training camp and pre-season, Walker was re-assigned to begin his professional career in the AHL with affiliate the Iowa Wild to open the 2022–23 season.

Walker was recalled from Iowa on December 9, 2022. He scored his first NHL goal on December 27, 2022 in a game versus the Winnipeg Jets.

Career statistics

Awards and honors

References

External links 
 

1999 births
Living people
Iowa Wild players
Lincoln Stars players
Minnesota Golden Gophers men's ice hockey players
Minnesota Wild players
Sioux City Musketeers players
Tampa Bay Lightning draft picks